Propylaea is a sculpture/fountain on the Maumee River, in downtown Toledo, Ohio.

About

In the early 1980s, Owens-Illinois was building their new world headquarters at One SeaGate. As a gift to the city, the company commissioned Dimitri Hadzi to design a sculpture to stand as the centerpiece of the SeaGate complex. The sculpture is made from granite, and is nestled as a fountain on a reflecting pond between One and Two SeaGate. Dimitri Hadzi described the use of water in the sculpture as a way of creating activity in the flat lands of Ohio.

Dedication

Next to the sculpture there is a dedication which reads:

   PROPYLAEA
   1980–82
   DIMITRI HADZI, SCULPTOR
   AMERICAN B. 1921
   THIS GRANITE SCULPTURE NAMED FROM THE GREEK WORD
   FOR "GATEWAY," WAS COMMISSIONED BY OWENS-ILLINOIS TO STAND
   AS A SYMBOLIC ENTRANCE TO SEAGATE AND A REVITALIZED TOLEDO.
   HISTORICALLY, TOLEDO HAS BEEN A GATEWAY TO EXPLORATION, INVENTION
   TRANSPORTATION AND INDUSTRY THAT HAS HELPED TO FORGE OUR NATION,
   AND THE PROMISE OF ITS FUTURE IS TYPIFIED IN SEAGATE.

See also
One SeaGate
Owens-Illinois

References

Outdoor sculptures in Ohio
Buildings and structures in Toledo, Ohio
1982 establishments in Ohio